Jan Huokko (born June 11, 1974) is a Swedish former professional ice hockey defenceman. He ended his ice hockey career as head coach for Kramfors-Alliansen of the Swedish Division 2 2012/2013.

During the 1998–99 season Huokko scored 21 goals to set an Elitserien record for most goals by a defenceman in an Elitserien regular season. This record stood until the 2013–14 season when that mark was surpassed by Leksands IF defenceman Patrik Hersley.

Huokko's parents are Finnish.

International
Huokko won a bronze medal with the Sweden men's national ice hockey team at the 1999 IIHF World Championship.

References

External links

1974 births
AIK IF players
Leksands IF players
Living people
SaiPa players
Södertälje SK players
Swedish ice hockey defencemen
Swedish people of Finnish descent